Bandino Selo is a village in Croatia, under the Slunj township, in Karlovac County. It is located 92km away from the national capital, Zagreb.

History 
Until the territorial reorganization in Croatia, Bandino Selo was part of the old municipality of Slunj. As an independent settlement, Bandino Selo has existed since the 2001 census. It was created by separating a part of the settlement of Crno Vrelo.

Population 
At the time of the 2001 census, the settlement had 7 inhabitants and 3 family households.

At the time of the 2011 census, the settlement had 6 inhabitants.

References

Geography of Croatia